Koester is an unincorporated community in St. Francois County, in the U.S. state of Missouri.

History
A post office called Koester was established in 1893, and remained in operation until 1917. The community has the name of C. E. Koester, the proprietor of a local mill.

References

Unincorporated communities in St. Francois  County, Missouri
Unincorporated communities in Missouri